Two-time defending champion Novak Djokovic defeated Andy Murray in the final, 6–7(2–7), 7–6(7–3), 6–3, 6–2 to win the men's singles tennis title at the 2013 Australian Open. It was his fourth Australian Open title and sixth major title overall. With the win, Djokovic became the first man in the Open Era to win the Australian Open three consecutive times.

Seeds

Qualifying

Wildcards

Draw

Finals

Top half

Section 1

Section 2

Section 3

Section 4

Bottom half

Section 5

Section 6

Section 7

Section 8

References
General

Men drawsheet on ausopen.com

Specific

External links
 2013 Australian Open – Men's draws and results at the International Tennis Federation

Men's Singles
Australian Open (tennis) by year – Men's singles